Angela Webber (12 January 1955 – 10 March 2007) was an Australian author, TV writer, producer and comedian.

Early life
Webber was born in 1955 to Bruce Webber, the head of light entertainment for ABC radio, and Nan, a journalist. She grew up in West Ryde, and was educated at the Presbyterian Ladies' College, Sydney in Croydon (together with schoolmate Johanna Pigott), where she was elected School Captain and was a winner of a prestigious PLC Gold Medallion in 1972. After finishing school, Webber enrolled at the University of Sydney, where she studied architecture and discovered her passion for writing comedy.

Career
In 1981, Webber joined the ABC's youth radio network Triple J, as a member of the comedy group The "J-Team", which also included the late Lance Curtis. The J-Team were featured alongside co-hosts Jonathan Coleman and Ian Rogerson (a.k.a. "Jonno and Dano") in this freewheeling Sunday afternoon satirical comedy program. The group then moved on to a popular stint as the stars of the Triple-J breakfast show, which was anchored by DJ Rusty Nails.

It was here that Webber met her husband-to-be, Stuart Matchett, and became known for her comedic alter-ego, the anarchic punk pensioner "Lillian Pascoe", who had a fondness for heavy metal music and who regularly proclaimed her slogan "Rage 'til ya puke!". She also made numerous guest appearances on radio and TV as Lillian and released a novelty single which parodied the hip hop classic "The Message".

In 1984, at just 29 years of age, Webber was diagnosed with breast cancer. With Matchett beside her, she underwent the many treatments with great grace and humour.

After the birth of her daughters, Lily and Sally, she wrote The P-Plate Parent with Richard Glover, in which she spoke of the adventures of being a mother. She also wrote material for TV performers such as Gerry Connolly, Garry McDonald, Dave Allen and Pamela Stephenson.

Webber's most successful and best-known work came later in her life in the form of the children's TV series Mortified. This series was a comedy drama playing on the embarrassment that children often feel towards their parents, and in 2006 won an Australian Film Institute Award for Best Children's Television Drama. Mortified has since been sold to more than 15 countries, including Britain, France, Italy and Argentina.

Later life
In 2005, Webber was diagnosed with lung cancer. She died at her Coogee home from cancer-related causes on 10 March 2007.

See also
List of breast cancer patients according to survival status
List of Old Girls of PLC Sydney

References

1954 births
2007 deaths
Australian women comedians
Comedians from Sydney
Australian women screenwriters
Deaths from cancer in New South Wales
Deaths from lung cancer
People educated at the Presbyterian Ladies' College, Sydney
Triple J announcers
Australian women radio presenters
Australian women television writers
Australian television writers
20th-century Australian comedians
20th-century Australian screenwriters
20th-century Australian women